Kardaras is a mountain village in the municipal unit of Levidi, Arcadia, Greece. It is situated in the eastern foothills of the Mainalo mountains, at 1,030 m elevation and is considered a traditional settlement. As of 2011, it had a population of 20. It is 5 km northwest of Kapsas, 6 km south of Levidi, 6 km east of Alonistaina and 15 km northwest of Tripoli. The Greek National Road 74 (Tripoli – Olympia – Pyrgos) passes east of the village.

Population

See also
List of settlements in Arcadia
List of traditional settlements of Greece

External links
Kardaras at the GTP Travel Pages
Practical information about Kardaras
Kardaras – history and information

References

Populated places in Arcadia, Peloponnese